The 2008 Polish Figure Skating Championships were held in two parts:
 The senior-level and novice-level competitions were held in Oświęcim between December 14 and 16, 2007,
 The Junior-level and age-group categories were held in Krynica between January 31 and February 3, 2008.

Senior results

Men

Ladies

Pairs

Ice dancing

Junior results

Men

Ladies

Pairs

Ice dancing

Novice results

Men

Ladies

Pairs

Ice dancing

Synchronized

External links
 Senior and Novice results
 Junior results

Polish Figure Skating Championships
2007 in figure skating
Polish Figure Skating Championships, 2008
2007 in Polish sport
Polish Figure Skating Championships, 2008